The mixed Nacra 17 class at the 2014 ISAF Sailing World Championships was held in Santander, Spain 16–21 September.

Results

References

Nacra 17
Nacra 17 World Championships